Just Another Band from East L.A. – A Collection is a two-CD compilation album by Los Lobos, released in 1993. It chronicles the first fifteen years of the band's recordings, spanning from 1978 to 1993, and includes album tracks, soundtrack contributions, live recordings and previously unreleased material.



Track listing

Notes
 "Volver, Volver" and "Let's Say Goodnight" recorded live December 11, 1987 at the Hollywood Palladium, Hollywood, California.
 "I Got to Let You Know" recorded live February 25, 1987 at the Paradiso, Amsterdam, the Netherlands. 
 "River of Fools" recorded live September 27, 1992 at Alberta Bair Theater, Billings, Montana. 
 "Carabina.30-30", "Wicked Rain", "Peace" and "Politician" recorded live November 16, 1992 at The Barns at Wolf Trap, Vienna, Virginia. 
 "Bertha" recorded live November 6, 1992 at The Carefree Theatre, West Palm Beach, Florida.
 "What's Going On" recorded live September 12, 1992 at World Music Theatre, Tinley Park, Illinois.

Personnel
Los Lobos
 David Hidalgo 
 Cesar Rosas 
 Louie Pérez 
 Conrad Lozano 
 Steve Berlin

Production
 T-Bone Burnett – producer (Disc one: 6–8, 10–12, 15, 16) 
 Steve Berlin – producer (Disc one: 6–8, 10, 17), mixing (Disc one: 9, 14 / Disc two: 7, 10, 13, 18)  
 Los Lobos – producer (Disc one: 2–4, 11, 12, 15, 16, 19–21 / Disc two: 1–5, 8, 9, 11, 12, 14, 16, 17) 
 Luis Torres – producer (Disc one: 2–4), liner notes 
 Mitchell Froom – producer (Disc one: 18 / Disc two: 6, 8, 9, 11, 12, 19)  
 Hal Willner – producer (Disc one: 22)  
 Larry Hirsch – producer (Disc two: 1–5)
 Tchad Blake – producer (Disc two: 19)  
 Keith Keller – engineer (Disc one: 1, 5)
 Cesar Rosas – engineer (Disc one: 9, 13, 14 / Disc two: 7, 10, 13, 18), mixing (Disc one: 9, 14 / Disc two: 7, 10, 13, 18)
 David Wells – engineer (Disc one: 9, 13, 14 / Disc two: 7, 10, 13, 18)
 Paul duGré – mixing (Disc one: 9, 14 / Disc two: 7, 10, 13, 18)
 Timothy Powell – engineer (Disc two: 15)
 Dave Collins – mastering

References

1993 compilation albums
Los Lobos albums
Slash Records compilation albums